Big Monster Adventura is the fourth album by Dorso. Like the album El Espanto Surge de la Tumba the band wanted to experience something brutal and extreme.

Track list
Big Monster Aventura
Godzilla
Cosmic Condoro
Panificator
Guerra Entre Mounstros de Distintos Planetas
Gran Chango
Manthra v/s Godzilla
Transformed in Cocodrile
Dinosaur Panorama
Husmeando bajo la Superficie
Gracias, oh! Seres de Cochayuyo
Samurai! We Fight!

Personnel
 Rodrigo Cuadra – Vocals, bass and keyboard
 Alvaro Soms – Guitar
 Marcelo Naves – drums

1995 albums
Dorso albums